Southrey Wood is reserve near Bardney in the county of Lincolnshire, England. Butterfly Conservation manages this reserve.

The woodland forms part of the Bardney Limewoods National Nature Reserve.

References

Butterfly Conservation reserves
Forests and woodlands of Lincolnshire
Sites of Special Scientific Interest in Lincolnshire